Radiofrequency thermocoagulation is a thermal pain treatment procedure. For example, percutaneous intradiscal radiofrequency thermocoagulation (PIRFT) involves the placement of an electrode or catheter into the intervertebral disc and applying an alternating radiofrequency current.

References

Pain management